Brickellia multiflora, the longleaf brickellbush, is a shrub in the family Asteraceae. It is found in the Mojave Desert region of the southwestern United States, in Arizona,  Nevada, and southern California.

Some authors classify this taxon as a variety of B. longifolia but others recognize it as a distinct species, B. multiflora.

References

multiflora
Flora of the California desert regions
Flora of Arizona
Flora of Nevada
Natural history of the Mojave Desert
Plants described in 1877
Taxa named by Sereno Watson
Flora without expected TNC conservation status